James Lentini (born February 7, 1958 in Detroit, Michigan) is an American composer, guitarist, and academic administrator.

After completing undergraduate studies at Wayne State University in guitar performance and composition, he pursued a master‘s degree in composition at Michigan State University and a doctorate from the University of Southern California, where he studied composition with Robert Linn and Morten Lauridsen. In addition to composing, Lentini is a guitarist who has studied with William Kanengiser, Joe Fava, and Charles Postlewate.

Compositions
His music has been performed by solo artists such as guitarist William Kanengiser and by international ensembles including the Krakow Philharmonic (Poland) and the Bohuslav Martinů Orchestra (Czech Republic). In addition to many commissions, his honors include first prize in the 2004 Choral Composition Contest at Bluffton University for his composition "Peace I Leave With You," the 2002 Andrés Segovia International Composition Prize for his solo guitar piece "Westward Voyage," the Atwater-Kent Composition Award (first Prize), the McHugh Composition Prize, a grant from "Meet the Composer," and several awards from ASCAP. In 2003, Lentini participated as a juror in the Segovia International Guitar Competition in La Herradura, Spain. He has been a Visiting Artist at the American Academy in Rome, and his work has been featured in new music festivals throughout Europe and the United States. In reviewing the recording "James Lentini, Chamber Music," released on the American Classics series by Naxos Records, critic Laurence Vittes, writing in Gramophone Magazine, called Lentini a "...typical classical music success story," and went on to describe Lentini's composition "Scenes from Sedona" by stating that "...the pièce de résistance of the disc may be 'Scenes from Sedona,' perhaps the best piece for viola and cello since Beethoven’s 'Eyeglasses' duet. In 2009, Lentini's suite for solo guitar entitled "The Four Seasons" was published by Mel Bay.

Academic career
From 2003 to 2007, Lentini served as the founding Dean of the School of Art, Media, and Music at The College of New Jersey. Previously, Lentini held the position of Professor of Composition at Wayne State University from 1988 to 2003, where he also served as Acting Chair and Associate Chair of the Department of Music. In 2007, Lentini accepted the appointment of Dean of the School of Creative Arts at Miami University in Oxford, Ohio, overseeing the Departments of Music, Art, Theatre, and Architecture/Interior Design, in addition to the Performing Arts Series and the University Museum.  He is recognized as an arts advocate and fundraiser through his efforts to promote the importance of the arts in education. In 2012, his new musical arrangement of Miami University's Alma Mater was performed in Carnegie Hall.

In 2013, Lentini received a Career Achievement Award in the Field of Music from Wayne State University. In May, 2013, he was named as the Senior Vice President for Academic Affairs and Provost at Oakland University in Rochester, MI.

In 2020, he was named as president of Molloy College.

Publications and recordings
His works are published by Mel Bay, Editorial de Musica Española Contemporanea, Acoma Editions, Doberman-Yppan, and the Society of Composers, Inc. Recordings appear on the Navona, Naxos, Capstone, and CRS recording labels.

References

Other sources

James Michael Floyd, Composers in the Classroom. Scarecrow Press, 2011.
Raymond Tuttle, "James Lentini: Building One's Own Audience." Fanfare Magazine, Nov-Dec 2010, pp. 110–118. Retrieved through EBSCO Host Connection, Nov 2, 2012. 
Michael Cameron, "Lentini, Orchestra Hall Suite." Fanfare Magazine, Nov-Dec 2010, pp. 118–119. Retrieved through EBSCO Host Connection, Nov 2, 2012.
Mark Stryker, "Winning Music, Strong Recordings." The Detroit Free Press, October 24, 2010. 
Laima, James Lentini-Chamber Music, WRUV Reviews, September 7, 2010.
Christopher Davis, "Monday Motivation: James Lentini."  September 6, 2010. . Retrieved June 5, 2011.
Steve Hicken, "College Town." Sequenza 21/, August 12, 2010. 
Bryce Rankin, Society of Composers, Inc, Grand Designs. Rev. of James Lentini's Music for Brass. 21st Century Music, May, 2000, pg. 34.
Mark Stryker, "Composers Infuse Music with Electronic Sounds." The Detroit Free Press, February 12, 1999.

External links
 
 Allmusic Bio for James Lentini
 James Lentini Radio at Pandora Internet Radio
 Comcast Newsmakers Television Interview
 The Rawlins Piano Trio, Opposites Attract by James Lentini, Azica Records
 WGUC Radio Playlist: James Lentini, solo guitar
 
 WCPE Radio Playlist: James Lentini's "Montage"
 "The Four Seasons" by James Lentini published by Mel Bay
 Naxos American Classics, James Lentini, Chamber Music
 Capstone Recordings, James Lentini, Music for Brass 
 CRS Recordings, "Montage" recorded by the St. Clair Trio
 James Lentini Wins XV Andrés Segovia Composition Competition (listed in history of the competition)
 " Westward Voyage" for solo guitar by James Lentini published by EMEC (SEEMSA), Spain
 “Concerto for Guitar and Strings” by James Lentini, published by Doberman-Yppan

1958 births
Living people
20th-century classical composers
American male classical composers
American classical composers
21st-century classical composers
Miami University faculty
Wayne State University faculty
American classical guitarists
American male guitarists
USC Thornton School of Music alumni
Michigan State University alumni
Wayne State University alumni
20th-century American guitarists
21st-century American guitarists
Guitarists from Detroit
20th-century American composers
Classical musicians from Michigan
20th-century American male musicians
21st-century American male musicians